2,6-Dimethoxybenzoquinone (2,6-DMBQ) is a chemical compound, classified as a benzoquinone, that has been found in Rauvolfia vomitoria and in Tibouchina pulchra.

Toxicity
At physiological concentrations 2,6-dimethoxybenzoquinone is an antibacterial substance. At higher concentrations there is evidence that it is mutagenic, cytotoxic, genotoxic, and hepatotoxic. Some reports have challenged its mutagenicity and others  exclude such a possibility.

References 

1,4-Benzoquinones
Phenol ethers